Caroline Nancy Park (born November 18, 1989) is a physician, and a former actress and hockey player.

She competed in the 2018 Olympic Games as an ice hockey forward for the Unified Korean team. Park is also a former child actress, having played roles in Naturally, Sadie and Degrassi: The Next Generation.

Life
Park was born in Ontario in 1989.

She became a naturalized citizen of South Korea in 2015.

As of 2021 or before, she is a physician.

Career
She competed in the Olympics as part of a unified team of 35 players drawn from both North and South Korea. The team's coach was Sarah Murray and the team was in Group B competing against Switzerland, Japan and Sweden.

References

External links
 

1989 births
Living people
Canadian women's ice hockey forwards
Canadian people of South Korean descent
People with acquired South Korean citizenship
Canadian sportspeople of Korean descent
Ice hockey players at the 2018 Winter Olympics
Olympic ice hockey players of South Korea
Sportspeople from Brampton
Princeton Tigers women's ice hockey players
South Korean women's ice hockey forwards
Winter Olympics competitors for Korea
Ice hockey players at the 2017 Asian Winter Games